Seongnam FC (Hangul: 성남 FC) is a South Korean professional football club based in Seongnam that competes in the K League 2, the second tier of South Korean football. Founded in 1989 as Ilhwa Chunma Football Club, the club has won seven national league titles, three FA Cups, three League Cups, and two AFC Champions League titles. Seongnam also placed fifth in the IFFHS Asian Clubs of the 20th century.

In 2014, the club was bought by the Seongnam City Government and was renamed as Seongnam FC.

History

Ilhwa Chunma era 1989–2013

Foundation 
In 1975, Sun Myung Moon, the owner of Tongil Group, wanted to found a professional football club in South Korea. Since the Korean Super League was founded in 1983, he tried to find a club to participate in the league but Choi Soon-young, the head of Korea Football Association, ignored Moon's interest due to a religious reasons.

Nevertheless, Tongil Group prepared the foundation of a new football club since 1986 and finally obtained a license from Korea Football Association as a club based in Seoul. Tongil Group firstly considered to find the club in Honam provinces but there was objection from the local community.

Officially, the club was founded on 18 March 1989 as Ilhwa Chunma Football Club (Chunma is known in Korean culture as the winged horse that the Jade Emperor riding in heaven) and the club based in Seoul became the sixth member of the Korean Super League. The foundation ceremony was held in Sheraton Walkerhill Hotel in Seoul. Korea Football Association helped the club to form a team quickly by giving the permission to have six priority picks out of players from Honam regions in the 1989 K League draft. The club has chosen six players, including Ko Jeong-woon and signed Park Jong-hwan as the head coach. The contract with Park was a lucrative deal back then, deposit 100 million KRW with 48 million KRW as annual salary.

Early successes 
The club was successful from its beginning, winning its first League Cup three years after its foundation in 1992 and winning three consecutive league titles from 1993 to 1995. In 1995, K League clubs wanted to stop the club's third consecutive title and agreed to change the league format back to two stages and the championship playoffs system; however, Ilhwa Chunma still won the title. Seongnam also won the 1995 Asian Club Championship, defeating Al-Nasr 1–0 after extra time in the final.

Cheonan Bound 
The club was forced to move out from Seoul in 1996, as a part of the decentralization policy of the league, Ilhwa Chunma moved to the city of Cheonan due to the city council proposition of refurbishing the Cheonan Oryong Stadium into the football-specific stadium and building another sports complex in Baekseok-dong. The club also changed its name to Cheonan Ilhwa Chunma as a part of the policy.

By the end of 1997, Ilhwa was still a successful team. The club reached the final of the 1996–97 Asian Club Championship and the 1997 Korean FA Cup. However, from 1998, Cheonan Ilhwa Chunma went into a slump due to the core players moved out for various reasons, including Valeri Sarychev, Chunma's goalkeeper, due to K League's year-by-year gradual restriction on foreign goalkeepers' appearances.

As a result, they had recorded the bottom of the league for two consecutive seasons, in 1998 and 1999. In mid-1999, Cha Kyung-bok considered to resign voluntarily due to the poor results.

Not only the results on the field, but also the facilities of Cheonan Oryong Stadium were below the standard. On 22 August 1998, Cheonan Ilhwa Chunma had to finish the game against Jeonnam Dragons during the penalty shoot-out, after 1–1 draw in extra time. According to K League regulations back then, teams were required to decide the winner with the golden goal or the penalty shoot-out after the extra time, if the match score is level at the end of normal time. Since the field was not equipped with a floodlight system, they had to finish their games before sunset. Cheonan Ilhwa Chunma won the game by a draw.

On 21 November 1999, Cheonan Ilhwa Chunma was crowned as the winners of the 1999 Korean FA Cup by winning the final 3–0 against Jeonbuk Hyundai Dinos at Jeju Stadium.

Resettled in Seongnam 
In 2000, the club moved to the Seoul satellite city of Seongnam and renamed themselves to Seongnam Ilhwa Chunma.
The move worked out very well, as the rejuvenated club went on to win three consecutive K League titles from 2001 to 2003, as well as a league cup title in 2002 and an A3 Champions Cup in 2004.

A disappointing 2004 campaign saw them meekly relinquish their title. However, they reached the final of the 2004 AFC Champions League, where despite winning the away leg 3–1, they lost the home leg 5–0 to Saudi Arabian club Al-Ittihad and lost the tie 6–3 on aggregate. The defeat led to the resignation of their manager, Cha Kyung-bok.

With Kim Hak-bum's management, the club bounced back to the forefront of South Korean football in style as they claimed their seventh league title in 2006, defeating Suwon Samsung Bluewings 3–1 on aggregate in the championship playoff final. This was their seventh K League title which is a record out of all the K League clubs.

Before they were defeated by Suwon Bluewings 2–1 on 15 July 2007 in the 2007 season, they went undefeated for 22 consecutive league matches – the third longest streak in the history of the K League.

Seongnam reached the final of the 2007 K League Championship but were beaten 4–1 on aggregate by the Pohang Steelers, despite finishing in first place during the regular season.

Seongnam's former player Shin Tae-yong returned as caretaker manager in the 2009 season, then as manager from the following season and continued the club's success. On 13 November 2010, Seongnam beat Iranian club Zob Ahan FC 3–1 in the final of the 2010 AFC Champions League. This was their second AFC Champions League title and qualified them directly into the quarter-finals stage of the 2010 FIFA Club World Cup. Seongnam finished the tournament in fourth place. Seongnam added another FA Cup trophy in 2011, beating Suwon Bluewings 1–0 in the final on 15 October 2011.

During the 2013 season, there were rumors that the club was going to be sold to Ansan city government after the death of Sun Myung Moon, the founder of the Unification Church. Moon was extremely devoted to football so the Unification Church had been running the club, but after his death, the Unification Church's board of directors saw no reason to continue running the club and stated their thoughts on selling the club to another organization. After the rumor was reported by the press, Ansan's mayor officially mentioned that the city is in a process of purchasing the club from Ilhwa. Estimated number of 800 supporters protested in front of the Seongnam city hall stating the city could not lose one of the most successful clubs in the Asian football's history. Seongnam city started negotiation to purchase the club from Ilhwa. In October 2013, Lee Jae-myung, the mayor of Seongnam, had a conference and announced that Seongnam City Council agreed to take over the club from Ilhwa Sports and will be participating under the name Seongnam FC.

Seongnam FC era (2014–present)
In December 2013, Seongnam City officially took over the club from Ilhwa Co., Ltd. They changed their symbol to magpie, the symbol of the Seongnam city, from chunma, which was the symbol of the Unification Church. The yellow color of their uniform was also replaced with black. Their first manager Park Jong-hwan, who had managed the club from 1988 to 1996 returned to the club as manager once again.

The club played the first home game as Seongnam FC on March 15, 2014 against FC Seoul resulting in a draw of 0:0. Seongnam FC's first victory was on March 26, 2014, beating their bitter rivals Suwon Samsung Bluewings 2–0. On April 22, 2014, manager Park Jong-hwan resigned after it was revealed that he had been assaulting players.

After months of confusion, the club appointed Kim Hak-bum, who previously led their golden age, as their manager. The return turned out to be extremely successful, as Seongnam not only escaped relegation but also won their third FA Cup trophy, beating FC Seoul in a penalty shoot-out on 23 November 2014.

In the 2016 season, after Incheon's win over Suwon FC on the final day of the season, Seongnam were placed at 11th and were relegated to the second division for the first time in their history after being defeated by northernmost side Gangwon FC on away goals in the promotion-relegation playoffs.

Nam Ki-il was announced as the club's new manager on 06/12/2017, replacing Park Kyung-hoon. He contributed a lot to the promotion of Seongnam Fc to the first division just one season after it was demoted to the second division.
 Nam resigned his position as the manager of the club on December 16, 2019

Kim Nam-il was appointed as the club's new manager on December 23, 2019 to lead the club in the upcoming 2020 K League 1 season.

Current squad

Out on loan

Current staff

Coaching staff 
Manager:  Lee Ki-hyung
Coach:  Namkung Woong, Lee Tae-woo
Goalkeeper Coach:  Back Min-chul
Fitness Coach:  Kim Hyung-rok

Managers

Honours

Domestic

League
 K League 1
Winners (7): 1993, 1994, 1995, 2001, 2002, 2003, 2006
Runners-up (3): 1992, 2007, 2009

 K League 2
Runners-up (1): 2018

Cups
 Korean FA Cup
Winners (3): 1999, 2011, 2014
 Runners-up (3): 1997, 2000, 2009
 Korean League Cup
Winners (3): 1992, 2002, 2004
Runners-up (3): 1995, 2000, 2006
 Korean Super Cup
Winners (1): 2002
Runners-up (2): 2000, 2004
 President's Cup
Winners (1): 1999

International

Asian

 Asian Club Championship/AFC Champions League
Winners (2): 1995, 2010
Runners-up (2): 1996–97, 2004

 Asian Super Cup
Winners (1): 1996

 A3 Champions Cup
Winners (1): 2004

Worldwide
 FIFA Club World Cup
Fourth place (1): 2010
 Afro-Asian Club Championship
Winners (1): 1996

Season-by-season records 

Key
Tms. = Number of teams
Pos. = Position in league

AFC Champions League record

References

External links 

 Official website 
 

 
Seongnam
K League 1 clubs
Association football clubs established in 1989
1989 establishments in South Korea
AFC Champions League winning clubs
Asian Super Cup winning clubs
K League 2 clubs